is a 2001 Japanese kaiju film directed and co-written by Shusuke Kaneko, with special effects by Makoto Kamiya. Distributed by Toho and produced under their subsidiary Toho Pictures, it is the 26th film in the Godzilla franchise and the third film in the Millennium era. The film stars Chiharu Niiyama, Ryudo Uzaki, Masahiro Kobayashi, Hideyo Amamoto, and Shirō Sano, with Mizuho Yoshida as Godzilla, Akira Ohashi as King Ghidorah, and Rie Ota as Baragon. In the film, Mothra, King Ghidorah, and Baragon defend Japan from Godzilla, who has been possessed by the souls of those that were killed during the Pacific War. Like the other films in the franchise's Millennium period, Godzilla, Mothra and King Ghidorah: Giant Monsters All-Out Attack serves as a direct sequel to the original 1954 Godzilla film, ignoring the events of every other installment in the series, minus a small reference to the Godzilla (1998).

Godzilla was originally slated to face off against a revamped version of Kamacuras, but Kaneko ultimately decided to place Godzilla against three monsters representing elements of the Earth: Varan, Baragon, and Anguirus. Toho later convinced him to replace Varan and Anguirus with King Ghidorah and Mothra in order to make the film a box-office success. Principal photography began on May 11, 2001, in Studio 1 at Toho Studios and wrapped on August 9, 2001.

Godzilla, Mothra and King Ghidorah: Giant Monsters All-Out Attack had its premiere at the 16th Tokyo International Film Festival on November 3, 2001. It was later released theatrically in Japan on December 15 as a double feature with Hamtaro: Adventures in Ham-Ham Land.

Plot
During a briefing with the Japan Self-Defense Forces (JSDF) regarding Godzilla's first attack, Admiral Taizo Tachibana is alerted about an American nuclear submarine that went missing off Guam. Search and rescue units find the sub destroyed and capture footage of a giant creature's fins nearby. Tachibana's daughter, Yuri, films a docudrama with her production crew at Mount Myōkō, where a mysterious earthquake briefly occurs. It occurs again later that night, burying a biker gang and leaving one surviving trucker, who witnesses the monster Baragon, which he misidentifies as Godzilla. The next day, Yuri's colleague Teruaki Takeda supports her theory that a monster may have been the cause of the mysterious earthquakes and gives her a book called The Guardian Monsters.

At Lake Ikeda, a Mothra larva attacks a group of teenagers who disturbed her shrine while in Aokigahara, a suicidal man accidentally encounters a frozen Ghidorah. Yuri interviews Hirotoshi Isayama, an elderly man who explains to her the legend of the Guardian Monsters: Baragon, Mothra, and King Ghidorah, iterating that they must be awakened before Godzilla destroys Japan. Yuri and her team visit the Guardian Monsters' shrine, where she finds a strange stone before returning to interview Isayama. In the process, she discovers that the souls of those who were killed during the Pacific War are embedded within Godzilla and are lashing out due to modern Japan's denial of its past crimes.

Godzilla and Baragon surface and battle in Hakone, with the former emerging victorious. Yuri is injured during the fray and goes on her own after Takeda refuses to take her to Godzilla's location. Mothra's cocoon is discovered in Lake Ikeda. After the jets fail to stop Godzilla, Tachibana sets up a defense line in Yokohama. An imago Mothra and a juvenile Ghidorah awaken and battle Godzilla in Yokohama. Mothra sacrifices herself and imbues her spirit into Ghidorah, transforming it into the 3,000-year-old dragon King Ghidorah, who manages to injure and drag Godzilla underwater. Tachibana and his colleague board miniature submarines to launch missiles into Godzilla's wound. Yuri and Takeda report on the struggle from a bridge that later collapses from Godzilla's atomic breath.

The shrine stone falls from Takeda's pocket and revives King Ghidorah, who saves Yuri and Takeda from their fall before they swim ashore while the monsters continue to fight. Godzilla destroys King Ghidorah, unleashing the spirits of the Guardian Monsters, which drag Godzilla into the sea. After entering Godzilla's body through its mouth, Tachibana fires a missile at the wound. Godzilla attempts to kill Yuri and Takeda, but Tachibana's missile explodes, causing its atomic breath to escape through the gaping wound and build pressure within its body. Tachibana escapes as Godzilla sinks and explodes after attempting to kill Tachibana with its atomic breath. Japan rejoices at their victory, with Tachibana saluting his colleagues and the guardian monsters. On the ocean floor, Godzilla's disembodied heart continues to beat.

Cast

Production

Development
During the production of Godzilla vs. Megaguirus (2000), filmmaker Shusuke Kaneko was appointed director of the next Godzilla film by Toho producer Shōgo Tomiyama. He cycled through various script ideas while attempting to conceive the film. In the earliest known script, Godzilla would have faced off against a revamped version of Kamacuras, but this idea was scrapped since Godzilla had fought another insectoid kaiju in the previous film, Godzilla vs. Megaguirus. A second idea involved Godzilla battling a new alien monster in a futuristic setting, but the script was considered too dark for a Godzilla film. The Guardian Monsters concept came next, though Kaneko's original script originally had Anguirus, Varan and Baragon defend Japan against Godzilla. Toho approved the script, but told him to replace Anguirus and Varan with the more popular Mothra and King Ghidorah, as the former pair were not considered bankable enough to guarantee a box-office hit. Skeptical at first, Kaneko managed to work the two new monsters into the film.

Furthermore, Godzilla's radioactive element was replaced with a mystical element, as its origins are rooted in Japan's past during World War II. While Godzilla is still a mutant dinosaur that was created by the atomic bomb, it is also described as the embodiment of those killed or left to die at the hands of the Imperial Japanese Army during the Pacific War. The extent to which his nuclear and spiritual origins balance is never specified. Kaneko, a lifelong pacifist, wanted to give the film an anti-war angle. The nuclear origin was left in because he knew that audiences wanted a realistic Godzilla, but he believed it worked better with a fantasy element.

Filming
Principal photography began on May 11, 2001, in Studio 1 at Toho Studios and wrapped on August 9, 2001.

Release

Box office
Produced with a budget of $9,400,000, Godzilla, Mothra and King Ghidorah: Giant Monsters All-Out Attack opened in Japan on December 15, 2001 on a double-bill with an animated film called Hamtaro: Ham Ham Big Land Adventure. In its opening weekend, it grossed approximately $1,900,000. By the end of its box office run, Godzilla, Mothra and King Ghidorah: Giant Monsters All-Out Attack grossed a total of approximately $20,000,000, with 2,400,000 admissions. It was one of the largest-grossing Godzilla films of the Millennium series in Japan.

Home media
The film was released on DVD on January 27, 2004, and on Blu-ray, bundled with Godzilla Against Mechagodzilla, on September 9, 2014.

English version

After the film was completed, Toho had their international versions of the movie dubbed in Hong Kong. This dubbed version significantly changes the meaning of several lines throughout the film.

Sony licensed GMK and Godzilla vs. Megaguirus with the hope of giving both films a theatrical release in the United States. However, after the American release of Godzilla 2000 under-performed at the box office, plans to give any newer Godzilla films a wide release were scrapped. Instead, Sony prepared edited television versions of both films. These premiered in the United States on the Sci-Fi Channel on August 31, 2003, during the channel's Labor Day marathon. In February 2004, the uncut international versions of both films were released on DVD with the addition of the original Japanese soundtracks, a first for an American release of a Godzilla film.

Critical response 
Review aggregator website Rotten Tomatoes reported a 63% rating from critics, based on 16 reviews with an average score of 5.29/10.

Troy Guinn of Eccentric Cinema gave the film a score of 8/10, calling it "one of only three Godzilla films I would recommend to anyone besides giant monster-movie fans or sci-fi buffs, the other two being the original Gojira and Mothra vs. Godzilla." Bryan Byun of DVD Verdict gave it a positive review, calling it "one of the most exciting entries in Godzilla's long cinematic history." Stomp Tokyo gave the film a score of 3/5, calling it "one of the better-looking entries in the series, albeit one of unfulfilled potential." John Wallis of DVD Talk felt that "the story is quite weak and somber" and that "this new take on [Godzilla] doesn't really work," while Gemma Tarlach of the Milwaukee Journal said that "GMK is best when it embraces its unabashed cheesiness. But when it tries to make Statements with Meaning, whether on Japan's past aggressions or ersatz samurai ruminations on the duty of a warrior, the movie flounders like a giant lizard hogtied by power lines." Film critic Leonard Maltin gave it three out of four stars, one of only two Godzilla films to receive more than two and a half stars, with the other being Godzilla 2000. The Boston Globe film critic Wesley Morris gave it three out of four stars, writing: "as absurd as its title, and by those standards it's a hilarious success."

Notes

References

Sources

External links

2001 films
2001 fantasy films
2000s Japanese-language films
2000s monster movies
2001 science fiction films
Japanese crossover films
Films about dragons
Films directed by Shusuke Kaneko
Films set in 1954
Films set in 2002
Films set in Aokigahara
Films set in Kagoshima Prefecture
Films set in Niigata Prefecture
Films set in Shizuoka Prefecture
Films set in Yamanashi Prefecture
Films set in Yokohama
Films set in the Pacific Ocean
Films set on islands
Giant monster films
Godzilla films
Japanese ghost films
Japanese fantasy films
Japanese science fiction films
Japanese sequel films
Kaiju films
Mothra
Reboot films
Submarine films
Toho films
2000s Japanese films